Santa Cecilia is a Romanesque and Renaissance-style church and bell-tower located in Acquasparta, Province of Terni, region of Umbria, Italy. 

The church was originally built in the 12th century, to honor Santa Cecilia, patron of the town. In 1581, the Cesi Chapel was commissioned by Isabella Liviani Cesi, greatgrandmother of Federico Cesi, founder of the Accademia dei Lincei. The church was associated with a seminary, and the collegiata has various canvases, from 16th to 18th centuries, at independent altars.

References

Churches in the province of Terni
Romanesque architecture in Umbria
Renaissance architecture in Umbria
12th-century Roman Catholic church buildings in Italy